Bouldin may refer to

People
James Bouldin (1792 - 1854), U.S. Representative from Virginia
Thomas Bouldin (1781 - 1834), U.S. Representative from Virginia

Places
Bouldin Creek, a neighborhood in Austin, Texas